T.B. Sheets is a retrospective album of recordings made in 1967 by Northern Irish musician Van Morrison, released in 1973 on Bang Records.  It contains songs that had appeared on Morrison's debut album, Blowin' Your Mind!, including his first hit, "Brown Eyed Girl".  It also features early versions of two songs that appeared in 1968 on Morrison's acclaimed album Astral Weeks — "Beside You" and Astral Weeks''' centerpiece, "Madame George".

This recording is listed as an unauthorized album that was released without Morrison's knowledge or approval. It has been re-issued on CD in various countries.

Track listing
All songs written by Van Morrison.

Side one
"He Ain't Give You None" - 5:11
"Beside You" (original take) - 6:07
"It's All Right" - 5:04
"Madame George" (original take) - 5:13

Side two
"T.B. Sheets" - 9:44
"Who Drove the Red Sports Car?" - 5:26
"Ro Ro Rosey" - 3:07
"Brown Eyed Girl" radio edit  - 3:01

Personnel
Van Morrison - vocals, guitar, harmonica on T.B. SheetsEric Gale- guitar
Hugh McCracken - guitar
Al Gorgoni - guitar
Donald Thomas - guitar
Bob Bushnell - bass
Russell Savakas - bass
Artie Butler - keyboards, Hammond organ
Paul Griffin - keyboards
Artie Kaplan - flute, saxophone
Seldon Powell - flute, saxophone
Jeff Barry - identified as "Jeff Berry" tambourine, backing vocals
The Sweet Inspirations - backing vocals
Bert Berns - production, backing vocals
Brooks Arthur - engineering, backing vocals
Herbie Lovelle - drums
Gary Chester - drums
George Devins - percussion, vibraphone

Notes

References
Yorke, Ritchie (1975). Into The Music'', London:Charisma Books, 

Van Morrison compilation albums
1973 compilation albums
Albums produced by Bert Berns